Your Wife and Mine is a 1927 American silent comedy film directed by Frank O'Connor and starring Phyllis Haver, Stuart Holmes and Wallace MacDonald.

Cast
 Phyllis Haver as Phyllis Warren 
 Stuart Holmes as Charlie Martin 
 Wallace MacDonald as Robert Warren 
 Barbara Tennant as Prisoner 
 Katherine Lewis as Winifred Martin 
 Blanche Upright as Mrs. Coy 
 June Lufboro as Tabitha Tubbs 
 Jay Emmett as Antonio Tubbs

References

Bibliography
 George A. Katchmer. Eighty Silent Film Stars: Biographies and Filmographies of the Obscure to the Well Known. McFarland, 1991.

External links
 

1927 films
1927 comedy films
Silent American comedy films
Films directed by Frank O'Connor
American silent feature films
1920s English-language films
American black-and-white films
1920s American films